"Show You the Way to Go" is a song written by Gamble and Huff and recorded by the Jacksons for their 1976 CBS debut album, The Jacksons. Released as a single in early 1977, it was the only number-one song for the group in the UK. It was later covered by Dannii Minogue in 1992.

The Jacksons version

"Show You the Way to Go" became a hit for the Jacksons, (formerly known as "The Jackson 5") after their departure from Motown nearly two years prior. The move made it easy for the brothers to write and produce their own material. They spent a couple of years under the production and direction of Gamble and Huff and were signed to Philadelphia International Records. This was one of the songs that the producers wrote for the brothers.

This song was released after "Enjoy Yourself," released a year earlier.   Michael sang lead and background vocals. Marlon Jackson, and the rest of the brothers (Randy having replaced Jermaine) had backup parts. The song reached No. 6 US Billboard R&B chart, No. 28 US Billboard Hot 100 and No. 1 on the UK Singles Chart. After recording the album Goin' Places in 1977, the Jacksons left Philadelphia International for Epic.

Record World called it "a smooth ballad" and said "There's only one way for this one to go, and that's up the chart."

The single's B-side was "Blues Away", which was the first song Michael Jackson wrote entirely himself.

Charts

Weekly charts

Year-end charts

Personnel
Lead vocals by Michael Jackson
Background vocals by Michael Jackson, Tito Jackson, Marlon Jackson, Jackie Jackson and Randy Jackson
Instruments by Tito Jackson, Randy Jackson, MFSB

Dannii Minogue version

Australian singer Dannii Minogue's version of "Show You the Way to Go" was produced by Bruce Forest and Andy Whitmore and was the first single released from her second album, Get into You. In 1992, it appeared on the NME charity album Ruby Trax, before being remixed and released as a single, reaching No. 30 on the UK Singles Chart in August of that year.

Critical reception
Larry Flick from Billboard called it "her strongest single to date", adding that "the cut sports a rich, soul-splashed house groove and a nicely matured vocal by Dannii." Alan Jones from Music Week described the song as "bright, breezy and inconsequential".

Track listings
 UK CD single
 "Show You the Way to Go" (7-inch version)
 "Success" (E-Smoove Groovy 12-inch)
 "Show You the Way to Go" (extended version)
 "Success" (Maurice's dub)

 Australian cassette single (C16040)
 "Show You the Way to Go" (7-inch version)
 "Success" (E-Smoove Groovy 12-inch)

 Australian CD single (D16040)
 "Show You the Way to Go" (7-inch version)
 "Success" (E-Smoove Groovy 12-inch)
 "Show You the Way to Go" (extended version)

 UK cassette single
 "Show You the Way to Go" (7-inch version)
 "Show You the Way to Go" (dub)

 Ruby Trax (Disc one, track 9)
 "Show You the Way to Go" (Eron Irving Remix)

Charts

References

Other sources

External links
DanniiMusic.com - official website
 
 

1976 songs
1977 singles
1992 singles
The Jackson 5 songs
Dannii Minogue songs
UK Singles Chart number-one singles
Songs written by Kenny Gamble
Songs written by Leon Huff
Epic Records singles
Philadelphia International Records singles
MCA Records singles